The Boca Raton Bowl is an annual National Collegiate Athletic Association (NCAA) sanctioned post-season Division I Football Bowl Subdivision (FBS) college football bowl game played in Boca Raton, Florida, since December 2014 on the campus of Florida Atlantic University (FAU) at FAU Stadium. Winners of the game received the Howard Schnellenberger championship trophy, named for the football head coach at FAU from 2001 to 2011.

Since 2020, the bowl has been sponsored by RoofClaim.com and officially known as the RoofClaim.com Boca Raton Bowl. Previous sponsors include Cheribundi (2017–2019) and Marmot (2015).

History
The bowl was founded on October 10, 2013, and was first played in December 2014 as one of the 2014–15 bowl games.

The bowl is owned and operated by ESPN Events, and is televised by ESPN as part of its annual "Bowl Week".  On October 6, 2015, Marmot, an outdoor clothing and sporting goods company, was announced as the title sponsor of the game. On December 1, 2017, Cheribundi, a New York based beverage company, was announced as the new title sponsor.

Conference tie-ins
The bowl had a tie-in with the Mid-American Conference (MAC) for 2014 and 2015, to face opponents from Conference USA (C-USA) in the first year and the American Athletic Conference (The American) in the second.

In 2014, Northern Illinois, winner of the 2014 MAC Championship Game, was sent as the conference's representative, while C-USA also sent its champion, Marshall. The MAC and C-USA did not have automatic bowl bids for their champions entering 2014; C-USA had lost its contract with the Liberty Bowl, while the Little Caesars Pizza Bowl, which usually took the MAC champion, was discontinued after its 2013 playing and the GoDaddy Bowl, which takes a MAC team and has the option to take the conference champion if it desires, did not invite Marshall. In 2015, the MAC sent Toledo and The American sent Temple.

In 2016 and 2017, C-USA and The American had primary tie-ins with the bowl. In 2016, C-USA sent Western Kentucky and The American sent Memphis. In 2017, C-USA sent Florida Atlantic while their opponent, Akron, came from the MAC. A C-USA vs. MAC matchup was again featured in 2018. The "affiliated conferences" for the 2019 game were The American, C-USA and MAC.

Game results
All rankings in AP Poll.

Source:

MVPs

The number of players honored as MVPs has varied.

Most appearances
Updated through the December 2022 edition (9 games, 18 total appearances).

Teams with multiple appearances

Teams with a single appearance
Won: BYU, Marshall, UAB

Lost: Akron, Appalachian State, Liberty, Memphis, SMU, Temple, UCF

Appearances by conference
Updated through the December 2022 edition (9 games, 18 total appearances).

Independent appearances: BYU (2020), Liberty (2022)

Game records

Media coverage
TV and radio coverage includes play-by-play announcers, color commentators, and sideline reporters.

Television

Radio

Legends honorees
Each December, the bowl recognizes one person associated with football in the state of Florida with the Palm Beach County Football Legends Award.

References

External links
 

 
College football bowls
American football in Florida
Annual sporting events in the United States
Recurring sporting events established in 2014
2014 establishments in Florida